Andrea Compagno (born 22 April 1996) is an Italian professional footballer who plays as a striker for Liga I club FCSB.

Career 

Born in Sicily, Compagno spent his formative years in the local academies of Palermo and Catania. He started out his senior career with several Serie D teams—namely Due Torri, Pinerolo, Argentina Arma, Borgosesia and Nuorese.

In 2018, Compagno moved to San Marino with Tre Fiori. He netted 37 goals from 41 matches in all competitions, and also won the Coppa Titano and the Super Coppa Sammarinese during his stint.

In the summer of 2020, Compagno joined Romanian Liga II side FC U Craiova. He amassed seven goals in 22 appearances during his first season, as they became league champions and achieved promotion to the top flight.

On 29 August 2022, FC U Craiova announced that Compagno was acquired by fellow Liga I team FCSB for a fee of €1.5 million plus 10% interest.

Career statistics

Club

Honours 

Tre Fiori
 Coppa Titano: 2018–19
 Super Coppa Sammarinese: 2019–20

FC U Craiova
 Liga II: 2020–21

Individual

 Campionato Sammarinese top scorer: 2018–19
 FC U Craiova Player of the Year: 2020–21, 2021–22
 Gazeta Sporturilor Foreign Player of the Year: 2022
 Gazeta Sporturilor Player of the Month: August 2022

References

External links 

 

1996 births
Living people
Footballers from Palermo
Italian footballers
Association football forwards
Catania S.S.D. players
Nuorese Calcio players
Pinerolo F.C. players
S.P. Tre Fiori players
Liga I players
Liga II players
FC U Craiova 1948 players
FC Steaua București players
Italian expatriate footballers
Expatriate footballers in San Marino
Italian expatriate sportspeople in San Marino
Expatriate footballers in Romania
Italian expatriate sportspeople in Romania